Richard or Dick Burke may refer to:

Richard Burke Jr. (1758–1794), Member of Parliament, son of Edmund Burke
Richard Burke (Irish politician) (1932–2016), Irish Fine Gael politician and European Commissioner
Richard Anthony Burke (born 1949), Irish bishop in the Roman Catholic Church
Richard J. Burke (1915–1999), Irish-American journalist, poet and playwright
Richard Burke, 2nd Earl of Clanricarde or Richard (Sassanach) Burke (d. 1582), Irish noble
Richard Burke, 4th Earl of Clanricarde or Richard de Burgh (1572–1635), Irish nobleman and politician
Richard Burke, 6th Earl of Clanricarde (d. 1666), Irish peer
Richard Burke, 8th Earl of Clanricarde (died 1709), Irish peer
Richard Óg Burke, 2nd Clanricarde or Mac William Uachtar (d. 1387), Irish chieftain and noble
Richard Óge Burke, 7th Clanricarde or Mac William Uachtar (d. 1519), Irish chieftain and noble
Richard Mór Burke, 9th Clanricarde or Mac William Uachtar (d. 1530), Irish chieftain and noble
Richard Bacach Burke, 11th Clanricarde or Mac William Uachtar (d. 1538), Irish chieftain and noble
Dick Burke (footballer, born 1920) (1920–2004), English football player
Dick Burke (Australian footballer) (born 1938), Australian rules footballer for South Melbourne
Richard Burke (Friends), a character on the television sitcom Friends
Rick Burke, a character  on the television series 24
Richard Burke (businessman) (1934–2008), co-founder of Trek Bicycle Corporation
Richard Burke (Alabama politician) (1807/08–1870), Baptist preacher and Alabama state representative

See also
 Ricard O'Sullivan Burke (1838–1922), Irish nationalist and American soldier, campaigner, and engineer